Dioctria linearis is a Palearctic species of robber fly in the family Asilidae. 

The species is diurnal.

References

External links
Geller Grim Robberflies of Germany
Images representing Dioctria linearis

Asilidae
Insects described in 1787
Brachyceran flies of Europe